Greg Stimac (born 1976) is an American artist who lives and works in California. His work is held in the collections of the Museum of Contemporary Photography and Museum of Contemporary Art, Chicago.

Education and background 
Greg Stimac was born a first generation Croatian-American in Euclid, Ohio. 
His interest in photography matured in Linda, California, while attending Yuba Community College (1997–2002) where he practiced traditional darkroom processes. In 2002, his work was included in the Crocker-Kingsley: California's Biennial at the Crocker Art Museum, (Sacramento, California) juried by artist Gladys Nilsson. 
He relocated to Chicago to finish his undergraduate education at Columbia College (2003–2005) and found employment at both the Museum of Contemporary Photography and the Croatian Ethnic Institute.
From  2011–2013 Stimac attended graduate school at Stanford University.

Artistic practice 

Stimac first gained attention for his serial photographic series titled "Recoil" (2005), a project made in collaboration with gun enthusiasts at unregulated shooting ranges in California and Missouri. Other subjects from this period include; lawn mowing, unattended campfires, urine-filled bottles at the roadside, and cars peeling out.

In 2009 Stimac collected ephemera on plexiglass plates attached to the grill of his car between destinations, then scanned them at road-side with a flatbed scanner. This work became a series loosely referred as “Driving Photographs” and served as a departure from his traditional photographic practice. Each individual image is titled with the point and destination.

In recent work, Stimac continues to investigate myth and reality of American identity through its landscape, cultural traditions, folk heroes, and histories, with subject matter such as the Golden Spike, Old Faithful, the Flag of the United States, and America's Independence Day (the 4th of July).

Exhibitions

Solo exhibitions 
 2007 Self-Titled, Museum of Contemporary Art, 12 X 12, Chicago, Illinois, 2007

Group exhibitions 
 2002  Crocker Kingsley Biennial Art Exhibition (juried by Gladys Nilsson), Crocker Art Museum Sacramento, California
 2004  Ultimatum, The Zoo, Chicago, Illinois
 2005  Chicago Art Open, Chicago, Illinois
 2006  In Sight, Museum of Contemporary Photography, Chicago, Illinois
 2007  Photocentric, MNCP, Minneapolis, Minnesota
 2008  This Land is Your Land, Museum of Contemporary Photography, Chicago, Illinois
 2008  Worlds Away: New Suburban Landscapes, Walker Art Center, Minneapolis, Minnesota
 2008  Lawn Nation: art and science of the American lawn, Notebaert Nature Museum, Chicago, Illinois
 2008  Beyond the Backyard, Museum of Contemporary Photography, Chicago, Illinoid
 2008  Worlds Away: New Suburban Landscapes, Heinz Architectural Center, Carnegie Museum of Art, Pittsburgh, Pennsylvania
 2008  USA Today, Museum of Contemporary Art, Chicago, Illinois
 2010  Faraway Nearby, Nerman Museum of Contemporary Art, Kansas City, Kansas
 2010 FAMILIAR: Portraits of Proximity, Kansas City Jewish Museum of Contemporary Art
 2011 Is This Thing On? / Screen Test, Contemporary Arts Center, Cincinnati, Ohio
 2012 Self-Help Book Club, Thomas Welton Stanford Art Gallery, Stanford, California
 2013 The 7 Borders, Kentucky Museum of Art and Craft, Louisville, Kentucky

Collections 
  Museum of Contemporary Art, Chicago, Illinois
  Museum of Contemporary Photography, Chicago, Illinois

References

External links 
 Greg Stimac's Official Website
 PUBLIC CULTURE photo essay by Greg Stimac 
 Lifeblood on the Road, essay by George Philip LeBourdais
 Review in Art in America
 Review in Newcity
 Review on Artslant, "Celebrate the independence of your nation by blowing up a small part of it"

Living people
1976 births
Artists from the San Francisco Bay Area